Penn Valley Airport  is a public airport a mile north of Selinsgrove, a borough in Snyder County, Pennsylvania. It is owned by the Penn Valley Airport Authority. The National Plan of Integrated Airport Systems for 2011–2015 categorized it as a general aviation facility.

Facilities and aircraft
Penn Valley Airport covers 149 acres (60 ha) at an elevation of 463 feet (141 m). Its one runway, 17/35, is 4,760 by 75 feet (1,451 x 23 m) asphalt.

In the year ending March 7, 2012 the airport had 28,000 aircraft operations, average 76 per day: 87% general aviation, 12% air taxi, and 1% military. 30 aircraft were then based at the airport: 67% single-engine, 13% ultralight, 10% multi-engine, 7% jet, and 3% helicopter.

Accidents and incidents 

 On August 23, 1987 a Piper PA-23-160 registered N4003P with three on-board crashed on takeoff killing all those aboard. The pilot and owner of the aircraft Karl Kovacs was taking two others on a scenic flight of the Susquehanna Valley. However the aircraft was overweight and in low ceilings and fog, Kovacs struggled to gain altitude and was in a high pitch angle and stalled at approximately 750 feet. The cause was determined to be pilot error and gross overload of the Piper.
 On October 4, 2013 a Piper PA-22 crashed on the runway during an attempted takeoff. Two people were seriously injured, National Transportation Safety Board and the Federal Aviation Administration investigated stating the cause was the "pilots failure to perform pre-flight check elevator trim would have shown the aircraft wasn't airworthy."

See also 

 List of airports in Pennsylvania
 List of airports by ICAO code: K

References

External links 
 Penn Valley Airport at Pennsylvania DOT Bureau of Aviation
 Heritage Aviation, the fixed-base operator (FBO)
 Aerial image as of April 1999 from USGS The National Map
 

Airports in Pennsylvania
County airports in Pennsylvania
Transportation buildings and structures in Snyder County, Pennsylvania